ArmadilloCon is a science fiction convention held annually in Austin, Texas, USA, since 1979. As the second longest running science fiction convention in Texas, it is sponsored by the Fandom Association of Central Texas and is known for its emphasis on literary science fiction. ArmadilloCon was traditionally held in mid-October during the weekend of the Texas-OU football game, but moved to a late-summer/early-fall weekend in 1998.

Traditions of ArmadilloCon 
ArmadilloCon generally focuses on literary science-fiction, with guests of honor typically being up-and-coming writers. Unique programming includes a "Fannish Feud" which has been held regularly since ArmadilloCon 4 in 1982, and has been hosted by Pat Cadigan, Walter Jon Williams, and Professor Griffin. The convention typically includes a large number of readings, and often ends with a story reading by Howard Waldrop.

A key element of the convention is the ArmadilloCon Writers' Workshop. The workshop was started in 1998, instigated by Chairs A.T. Campbell III and Lori Wolf. The workshop is held during the day on the Friday of the convention, with a Writers' Track of sessions available during the rest of the weekend.

Past conventions 

 ArmadilloCon 1 (May 11–13, 1979)
 Chair: Willie Siros
 Guest of Honor: John Varley
 Fan Guest: Jeanne Gomoll
 Toastmaster: Howard Waldrop
 Location: Villa Capri
 ArmadilloCon 2 (October 3–5, 1980)
 Chair: Willie Siros
 Guest of Honor: Gardner Dozois
 Fan Guest: Harry O. Morris
 Toastmaster: Chad Oliver
 ArmadilloCon 3 (October 1981)
 Chair: Willie Siros
 Guest of Honor: Chad Oliver
 Fan Guest: Bob Wayne
 Toastmaster: Ed Bryant
 Location: Ramada Riverside
 ArmadilloCon 4 (October 1–3, 1982)
 Chair: Ed Scarbrough
 Guests of Honor: George Alec Effinger and George R. R. Martin
 Fan Guest: Joe Pumilia
 Toastmaster: Ed Bryant
 ArmadilloCon 5 (October 7–9, 1983)
 Chair: Ed Scarborough
 Guest of Honor: Howard Waldrop
 Fan Guest: Becky Matthews
 Toastmaster: Neal Barrett, Jr.
 Location: Villa Capri Motor Hotel
 ArmadilloCon 6 (October 5–7, 1984)
 Chair: Ed Scarborough
 Guest of Honor: John Sladek
 Fan Guests: James A. Corrick and Gay Miller Corrick
 Toastmaster: Joe R. Lansdale
 Special Guest: Ellen Datlow
 ArmadilloCon 7 (1985)
 Relaxacon after the third occasional North American Science Fiction Convention, dubbed "LoneStarCon 1", was held in Austin.
 ArmadilloCon 8 (October 10–12, 1986)
 Chair: Robert Taylor
 Guest of Honor: William Gibson
 Editor Guest: Ellen Datlow
 Fan Guest: Debbie Notkin
 Toastmaster: Lewis Shiner
 ArmadilloCon 9 (October 9–11, 1987)
 Chair: Fred Duarte, Jr.
 Guest of Honor: Bruce Sterling
 Artist Guest: J. R. Daniels
 Editor Guest: Beth Meacham
 Fan Guest: Mark Olson
 Toastmaster: Pat Cadigan
 ArmadilloCon 10 (October 7–9, 1988)
 Chairs: Fred Duarte, Jr. and Karen Meschke
 Guest of Honor: K. W. Jeter
 Artist Guest: Brad W. Foster
 Editor Guest: Ginjer Buchanan
 Fan Guests: Jane Dennis and Scott Dennis
 Toastmaster: Lewis Shiner
 Location: Wyndham Southpark
 ArmadilloCon 11 (October 13–15, 1989)
 Chair: Karen Meschke
 Guest of Honor: Lewis Shiner
 Artist Guest: Don Ivan Punchatz
 Editor Guest: Pat LoBrutto
 Fan Guest: Mike Glyer
 Toastmaster: Connie Willis
 Special Guests: William Gibson and Tom Maddox (sponsored by MCC)
 Location: Wyndham Southpark
 ArmadilloCon 12 (October 12–14, 1990)
 Chair: Ed Graham
 Guest of Honor: Pat Cadigan
 Artist Guest: Jean Elizabeth Martin (JEM)
 Editor Guest: Susan Allison
 Fan Guest: Debbie Hodgkinson
 Toastmaster: Melinda M. Snodgrass
 Special Guests: Vernor Vinge and Marc Stiegler (sponsored by MCC)
 Location: Wyndham Southpark
 ArmadilloCon 13 (October 11–13, 1991)
 Chair: Casey Hamilton
 Guest of Honor: Dan Simmons
 Artist Guest: Dell Harris
 Editor Guest: Amy Stout
 Fan Guest: Pat Mueller (Pat Virzi)
 Toastmistress: Emma Bull
 Location: Wyndham Southpark
 ArmadilloCon 14 (October 9–11, 1992)
 Chairs: Lori Wolf and Fred Duarte, Jr.
 Guest of Honor: Neal Barrett, Jr.
 Artist Guest: Darrell K. Sweet
 Editor Guest: Gardner Dozois
 Fan Guest: Allan Jackson
 Toastmaster: Kim Stanley Robinson
 Location: Wyndham Southpark
 ArmadilloCon 15 (November 5–7, 1993)
 Chairs: Willie Siros and Lori Wolf
 Guest of Honor: Gwyneth Jones (novelist)
 Artist Guest: Harry O. Morris
 Editor Guest: John Douglas
 Toastmaster: Michael Bishop (author)
 Location: Red Lion
 ArmadilloCon 16 (October 7–9, 1994)
 Chairs: Ed Graham and Casey Hamilton
 Guest of Honor: Elizabeth Moon
 Artist Guest: David A. Cherry
 Editor Guest: Gordon Van Gelder
 Fan Guest: Gregory Benford
 Toastmaster: Bradley Denton
 Special Guest: Guy Gavriel Kay
 Location: Red Lion
 ArmadilloCon 17 (October 6–8, 1995)
 Chairs: Fred Duarte, Jr. and Dan Tolliver
 Guest of Honor: Alexander Jablokov
 Artist Guest: Vincent Di Fate
 Editor Guest: John Silbersack
 Fan Guests: Dick Smith and Leah Zeldes Smith
 Toastmaster: Terry Bisson
 Location: Red Lion
 ArmadilloCon 18 (October 11–13, 1996)
 Chair: Dan Tolliver
 Guest of Honor: Jonathan Lethem
 Artist Guest: Bob Eggleton
 Editor Guest: Patrick Nielsen Hayden
 Fan Guests: Spike Parsons and Tom Becker
 Toastmaster: Mike Resnick
 Location: Red Lion
 ArmadilloCon 19 (1997)
 Relaxacon after the 55th World Science Fiction Convention, dubbed "LoneStarCon 2", was held in San Antonio.
 Chair: John Gibbons
 Guest of Honor: Mary Rosenblum
 Location: Hunt, Texas
 ArmadilloCon 20 (August 28–30, 1998)
 Chairs: A. T. Campbell, III and Lori Wolf
 Guest of Honor: Bradley Denton
 Artist Guest: Mitchell Bentley
 Editor Guest: David G. Hartwell
 Fan Guest: Peggy Ranson
 Toastmaster: Steven Gould
 Special Guest: Peter F. Hamilton (sponsored by ALAMO, Inc.)
 Location: Omni Southpark Hotel
 ArmadilloCon 21 (September 10–12, 1999)
 Chairs: Mona Gamboa and John Gibbons
 Guest of Honor: Sean Stewart
 Artist Guest: Wayne Barlowe
 Editor Guest: Shawna McCarthy
 Fan Guest: Harry Stubbs
 Toastmaster: William Browning Spencer
 Special Guest: Neil Gaiman (sponsored by ALAMO, Inc.)
 Location: Omni Southpark Hotel
 ArmadilloCon 22 (August 18–20, 2000)
 Chairs: John Gibbons and Dan Tolliver
 Guest of Honor: Catherine Asaro
 Artist Guest: Adam "Mojo" Lebowitz
 Editor Guest: Betsy Mitchell
 Fan Guest: Robert Taylor
 Toastmaster: Mary Doria Russell
 Special Guest: Kathleen Ann Goonan (sponsored by ALAMO, Inc.)
 Location: Omni Southpark Hotel
 ArmadilloCon 23 (November 16–18, 2001)
 Chairs: Renee Babcock and Lori Wolf
 Guest of Honor: J. Gregory Keyes
 Artist Guest: John Jude Palencar
 Editor Guest: Toni Weisskopf
 Fan Guest: Teddy Harvia
 Toastmaster: Walter Jon Williams
 Special Guest: Esther Friesner (sponsored by ALAMO, Inc.)
 Location: Austin Hilton North
 ArmadilloCon 24 (August 16–18, 2002)
 Chairs: Renee Babcock and Charles Siros
 Guest of Honor: Martha Wells
 Artist Guests: Frank Cho and Scott Kurtz
 Editor Guest: Tom Doherty
 Fan Guests: Kurt Baty and Scott Bobo
 Toastmaster: Joe R. Lansdale
 Special Guest: Robin Hobb (sponsored by ALAMO, Inc.)
 Location:Omni Southpark Hotel
 ArmadilloCon 25 (August 8–10, 2003)
 Chair: John Gibbons
 Guest of Honor: Kage Baker
 Fan Guest: Willie Siros
 Toastmaster: Aaron Allston
 Editor Guest: Anne Groell
 Artist Guest: John Picacio
 Special Guest: Vernor Vinge
 Location: Austin Hilton North
 ArmadilloCon 26 (August 13–15, 2004)
 Chairs: Kimm Antell and Chuck Siros
 Guest of Honor: Sharon Shinn
 Fan Guest: Chaz "Hazel" Boston Baden
 Toastmaster: K. D. Wentworth
 Editor Guest: Stanley Schmidt
 Artist Guest: Charles Vess
 Mystery Guests of Honor: Charlaine Harris & Barbara Hambly (sponsored by ALAMO, Inc.)
 Location: Austin Hilton North
 ArmadilloCon 27 (August 19–21, 2005)
 Chairs: Renee Babcock and John Gibbons
 Guest of Honor: Charles Stross
 Fan Guests: Jim Mann & Laurie Mann
 Toastmaster: Charles de Lint
 Editor Guest: Jim Minz
 Artist Guest: Ctein
 Special Guest: Sean McMullen (sponsored by ALAMO, Inc.)
 Location: Doubletree Hotel Austin
 ArmadilloCon 28 (August 11–13, 2006)
 Chair: Kimm Antell
 Guest of Honor: Julie E. Czerneda
 Fan Guest: Grant Kruger
 Toastmaster: Esther Friesner
 Editor Guest: Diana Gill
 Artist Guest: Ellisa Mitchell
 Special Guest: James P. Hogan
 Location: Doubletree Hotel Austin
 ArmadilloCon 29 (August 10–12, 2007)
 Chair: Renee Babcock 
 Guest of Honor: Louise Marley
 Fan Guest: Patty Wells
 Toastmaster: Howard Waldrop
 Editor Guest: Sharyn November
 Artist Guest: Gary Lippincott
 Location: Doubletree Hotel Austin
 ArmadilloCon 30 (August 15–17, 2008)
 Chairs: Kurt Baty and Chuck Siros
 Guest of Honor: John Scalzi
 Artist Guest: David Lee Anderson
 Fan Guest: Kelly Persons
 Toastmaster: Bill Crider
 Editor Guest: Sheila Williams
 Special Guests: Gay Haldeman and Joe Haldeman
 Location: Doubletree Hotel Austin
 ArmadilloCon 31 (August 14–16, 2009)
 Chair: Kimm Antell
 Guest of Honor: Scott Lynch
 Artist Guest: Stephan Martinière (cancelled)
 Editor Guest: Chris Roberson
 Fan Guest: Karen Meschke
 Toastmaster: Scott A. Cupp
 Special Guest: Joan D. Vinge
 Location: Doubletree Hotel Austin
 ArmadilloCon 32 (August 27–29, 2010)
 Chairs: Elizabeth Burton and Dan Tolliver
 Guest of Honor: Rachel Caine
 Artist Guest: R. Cat Conrad
 Editor Guest: Anne Sowards
 Fan Guest: Elspeth Bloodgood
 Toastmaster: Nancy Kress
 Urban Fantasy Special Guest: Ilona Andrews
 Steampunk Special Guest: Michael Bishop
 Location: Renaissance Hotel Austin
 ArmadilloCon 33 (August 26–28, 2011)
 Chairs: Jennifer Juday and Charles Siros
 Guest of Honor: Paolo Bacigalupi
 Artist Guest: Vincent Villafranca
 Editor Guest: Lou Anders
 Fan Guest: Fred Duarte, Jr.
 Toastmaster: Mark Finn
 Special Guests: Emma Bull and Will Shetterly
 Location: Renaissance Hotel Austin
 ArmadilloCon 34 (July 27–29, 2012)
 Chair: Sara Felix
 Guest of Honor: Anne Bishop
 Fan Guest: Bill Parker
 Editor Guest: Liz Gorinsky
 Special Guest: Chloe Neill
 Artist Guest: Julie Dillon
 Toastmaster: A. Lee Martinez
 Location: Renaissance Hotel Austin
 ArmadilloCon 35  / GlyptoCon 3 (October 25–27, 2013)
 Relaxacon after the 71st World Science Fiction Convention, dubbed "LoneStarCon 3", was held in San Antonio.
 Chair: Willie Siros
 Location: Canyon Lake, Texas
 ArmadilloCon 36 (July 25–27, 2014)
 Chair: Kimm Antell
 Guest of Honor: Ted Chiang
 Fan Guest: Michael Walsh
 Editor Guest: Jacob Weisman
 Artist Guest: Stephanie Pui-Mun Law
 Science Guest: Sigrid Close
 Special Guest: Ian McDonald
 Toastmaster: Mario Acevedo
 Location: Omni Southpark Hotel
 ArmadilloCon 37 (July 24–26, 2015)
 Chairs: Jennifer Juday & Charles Siros
 Guest of Honor: Ken Liu
 Special Guest: James Morrow
 Fan Guest: John DeNardo (SF Signal)
 Editor Guest: L. Timmel Duchamp
 Artist Guest: Rocky Kelley
 Toastmaster: Stina Leicht
 Location: Omni Southpark Hotel
 ArmadilloCon 38 (July 29–31, 2016)
 Chair: Charles Siros
 Guest of Honor: Wesley Chu
 Fan Guest: Ken Keller
 Editor Guest: Joe Monti
 Artist Guest: Christina Hess
 Special Guest: Dominick Saponaro
 Toastmaster: Joe McKinney (author)
 Location: Omni Southpark Hotel
 ArmadilloCon 39 (August 4–6, 2017)
 Chair: John Gibbons
 Guest of Honor: Nisi Shawl
 Special Guest: Tamora Pierce
 Artist Guest Mark A. Nelson
 Fan Guest: A.T. Campbell, III
 Toastmaster: Don Webb
 Location: Omni Southpark Hotel
 ArmadilloCon 40 (August 3–5, 2018)
 Chair: Jennifer Juday
 Guest of Honor: Deji Bryce Olukotun
 Special Guest: Holly Black
 Special Guest: Robert J. Sawyer
 Artist Guest: Rosemary Valero-O'Connell
 Fan Guest: Craig W. Chrissinger
 Toastmaster: Aaron de Orive
 Location: Omni Southpark Hotel
 ArmadilloCon 41 (August 2–4, 2019)
 Chairs: Jennifer Juday and Charles Siros
 Guest of Honor: Rebecca Roanhorse
 Toastmaster: Marshall Ryan Maresca
 Fan Guest: Dan Tolliver
 Editor Guest: Patrice Caldwell
 Science Guest: Moriba K. Jah, Ph.D.
 Special Guest: Martha Wells
 Location: Omni Southpark Hotel
 ArmadilloCon 42 (August 28–30, 2020)
 Small virtual replacement for in-person event, due to COVID-19/SARS-CoV-2
 Chair: Jennifer Juday
 Special Guest: Tobias S. Buckell
 Featured Writer: Cadwell Turnbull
 Featured Writer: Libia Brenda
 Artist Guest: Priscilla Kim
 Fan Guests: Clif & Margaret Davis
 Location: Virtual
 ArmadilloCon 43 (October 15–17, 2021)
 Chair: Jonathan Miles
 Guest of Honor: Nicky Drayden
 Special Guest: David Liss
 Special Guest: Marshall Ryan Maresca
 Artist Guest: Gary Villarreal
ArmadilloCon 44 (August 5–7, 2022)
 Chair: Jennifer Juday
 Writer Guest: Darcie Little Badger
 Special Guest: Fonda Lee
 Special Guest: Ellen Klages
 Toastmaster: Cass Morris
 Artist Guest: Lauren Raye Snow
 Location: Austin Southpark Hotel

Upcoming conventions

References

External links 
 ArmadilloCon official site
 Fandom Association of Central Texas
 Houston SF Ritual Breakfast main page

Science fiction conventions in the United States
Culture of Austin, Texas
Conventions in Texas
1979 establishments in the United States
Recurring events established in 1979